Hour of the Wolf is a 1968 film directed by Ingmar Bergman.

Hour of the Wolf or The Hour of the Wolf may refer to:

Arts and entertainment
 Hour of the Wolf (novel), a 2013 novel by Andrius Tapinas
 Hour of the Wolf (radio show), literary WBAI radio show hosted by Jim Freund
 "The Hour of the Wolf", a 1996 episode of Babylon 5
 "The Hour of the Wolf", a 2017 episode of Beyond

Music
 Hour of the Wolf (album), a 1975 album by Steppenwolf
 Hour of the Wolf (song), a 2015 song by Elnur Hüseynov
"The Hour of the Wolf", a 2008 song by Madrugada from Madrugada
"Hour of the Wolf", a 2020 song by Ulver from Flowers of Evil

See also
 The Wolf's Hour, the 1989 novel by Robert R. McCammon